Vermont elected its members September 2, 1828.  Vermont required a majority vote for election, so the  district election was settled on the second ballot on November 11, 1828 and the  district election was settled on the eighth ballot on November 2, 1829.

See also 
 1828 and 1829 United States House of Representatives elections
 List of United States representatives from Vermont

Notes

References 

United States House of Representatives elections in Vermont
Vermont
Vermont
United States House of Representatives
United States House of Representatives